Ronald Watkins Williams (8 July 1907 –14 March 1958) was a British Labour Party politician.

He was elected to the House of Commons as the Member of Parliament (MP) for Wigan in a by-election in 1948, following the death in 1947 of sitting Labour MP William Foster.

Williams was re-elected in this safe Labour seat at the 1950 general election and returned again at the 1955 general election, but died aged 50 in 1958. At the subsequent by-election in 1958, the seat was held for Labour by Alan Fitch.

References

External links 
 

1907 births
1958 deaths
Labour Party (UK) MPs for English constituencies
Members of the Parliament of the United Kingdom for Wigan
National Union of Mineworkers-sponsored MPs
UK MPs 1945–1950
UK MPs 1950–1951
UK MPs 1951–1955
UK MPs 1955–1959